Delta Theta Psi may refer to:
 Delta Theta Psi (Wooster), a local sorority at the College of Wooster, Wooster, Ohio.
 Delta Theta Psi (sorority), a local sorority with a South Asian emphasis, at the University of Michigan, Ann Arbor, Michigan.